Robin C. Shackleford (born October 30, 1970) is an American politician who has served in the Indiana House of Representatives from the 98th district since 2012.

On November 10, 2022, Shackleford announced her intention to run for mayor of Indianapolis in 2023.

References

1970 births
Living people
Democratic Party members of the Indiana House of Representatives
21st-century American politicians
21st-century American women politicians
African-American state legislators in Indiana
African-American women in politics
Politicians from Indianapolis
Women state legislators in Indiana
21st-century African-American women
21st-century African-American politicians
20th-century African-American people
20th-century African-American women